A nuclear microreactor is a plug-and-play type of nuclear reactor which can be easily assembled and transported by road, rail or air. Microreactors are 100 to 1,000 times smaller than conventional nuclear reactors, and when compared with small modular reactors (SMRs), their capacity is between 1 to 20 megawatts whereas SMRs comes in the range from 20 to 300 megawatts. Due to their size, they can be deployed to locations such as isolated military bases or communities affected by natural disasters. They are designed to provide resilient, non-carbon emitting, and independent power in challenging environments. The nuclear fuel source for the majority of the designs is "High-Assay Low-Enriched Uranium", or HALEU.

History
Nuclear microreactors originated in the United States Navy's nuclear submarine project, which was first proposed by Ross Gunn of United States Naval Research Laboratory in 1939. The concept was adapted by Admiral Hyman Rickover to start American nuclear submarine program in 1950s. The first US nuclear submarine to be constructed was the USS Nautilus, which was launched in 1955. It was installed with Westinghouse's S2W reactor - a pressurized water type reactor which gave out 10 megawatts output.

Current development 
Microreactors for civilian use are currently in the earliest stages of development, with individual designs ranging in various stages of maturity.

In 2018, the NASA successfully demonstrated a kilowatt-scale microreactor based on its Kilopower technology. It is being developed for supporting human exploration of the Moon and Mars missions. It uses a unique technological approach to cool down the reactor core (which is about the size of a paper towel roll): airtight heat pipes transfer reactor heat to engines that convert the heat to electricity.

References

Energy conversion
Nuclear technology
Power station technology
 
Nuclear research reactors
Nuclear power reactor types
Nuclear power